was a town located in Uda District, Nara Prefecture, Japan.

As of 2005, the town had an estimated population of 8,647 and a density of 182.27 persons per km². The total area was 47.44 km².

On January 1, 2006, Ōuda, along with the towns of Haibara and Utano (all from Uda District), was merged to create the city of Uda.

The town of Ōuda lies in a valley between two long mountain ranges in northeastern Nara, Japan. A three-mile long stretch of national routes 166 and 370 in the southern part of the town is where most of the businesses and homes are clustered. A large portion of flat land north on route 370 is less densely populated, covered mostly by rice fields. A large torii, or Japanese Gate, rises out of the rice paddies.

Dissolved municipalities of Nara Prefecture
Populated places disestablished in 2006
2006 disestablishments in Japan
Uda, Nara